is a passenger railway station located in Higashi-ku in the city of Okayama, Okayama Prefecture, Japan. It is operated by the West Japan Railway Company (JR West).

Lines

Station layout
The station consists of a side platform and an island platform, connected by a footbridge. Platform 2 (middle line) shared by trains in both directions, and freight trains also sometimes stop there. The station is unattended.

Platforms

History
Mantomi Station was opened on 26 December 1897 With the privatization of Japanese National Railways (JNR) on 1 April 1987, the station came under the control of JR West.

Passenger statistics
In fiscal 2019, the station was used by an average of 631 passengers daily

Surrounding area
Okayama City Higashi Ward Office Seto Branch Office
Okayama Municipal Chikusa Elementary School
Mantomi Todai-ji Tile Kiln Ruins

See also
List of railway stations in Japan

References

External links

 JR West Station Official Site

Railway stations in Okayama
Sanyō Main Line
Railway stations in Japan opened in 1897